Hotel Shilla is a South Korean operator of luxury hotels and duty-free shops. It is a member of The Leading Hotels of the World. The company is an affiliate of Samsung.

History
Hotel Shilla started operations in March 1979 at the direction of Lee Byung-chul, founder of the Samsung Group. Before 1979, it was the state guest house of Republic of Korea under the Park Chung-hee government. Now, it has been expanding into the commissioned management of fitness facilities as well as into the restaurant business. The Shilla focuses on "the harmony and beauty of modernism and tradition". They have hotels located in Seoul, Jeju, and Suzhou, China.

In January 2008, The Shilla was selected as one of the top 500 hotels in the world by Travel & Leisure.

The Seoul hotel reopened to the public on August 1, 2013, after seven months of renovations, featuring the first year-round outdoor pool in Seoul ("Urban Island") and the Shilla-Sitaras Fitness Center.

Facilities

The fitness center, affiliated with Sitaras Fitness, is equipped with a digital measurement room, a first in Korea, and provides a differentiated fitness coaching service using a smart coaching system. A fitness program is customized for each client according to the results of a physical fitness assessment for systematic management.

Shilla Hotel's Yeong Bin Gwan (영빈관) is considered a place where many celebrities (entrepreneurs, entertainers, etc.) get married. The wedding hall is divided into two-story Dynasty Hall (650 seats), Ruby Hall  (130 seats) and Topaz Hall (120 seats) on the first floor. The more seats there are, the higher the price.

Properties 
The Shilla
The Shilla Seoul
The Shilla Jeju
Shilla Monogram
Shilla Monogram Quangnam Danang
Shilla Stay
Shilla Stay Gwanghwamun
Shilla Stay Mapo
Shilla Stay Seodaemun
Shilla Stay Yeoksam
Shilla Stay Seocho
Shilla Stay Guro
Shilla Stay Samsung
Shilla Stay Dongtan
Shilla Stay Cheonan
Shilla Stay Ulsan
Shilla Stay Haeundae
Shilla Stay Seobusan
Shilla Stay Jeju

References

Hotel chains in South Korea
Samsung subsidiaries
Jung District, Seoul
South Korean brands
S
Hotels established in 1979
Hotel buildings completed in 1979
Lee family (South Korea)